is a short story by manga author Junji Ito, originally included in The Junji Ito Horror Comic Collection. A one-hour Japanese television drama adaptation was broadcast in 2000. The adaptation was directed by Higuchinsky, whose film adaptation of Ito's Uzumaki had been released earlier the same year. The story was also adapted in the second segment of the second episode of the anime Junji Ito Collection.

Plot
Dr. Kuroda, a celebrated neurosurgeon, expresses severe doubt when a patient named Tetsuro Mukoda is admitted, complaining of increasingly long dreams, although his assistant, Dr. Yamauchi, believes there may be some truth to Mukoda's complaints. Another patient at the hospital, Mami Takeshima, who was admitted for treatment for a benign tumour, begins experiencing a heightened fear of death, and has a harrowing encounter with Mukoda, who wanders the halls at night, too afraid to sleep.

Though he continues to believe Mukoda's symptoms are just hallucinations, Dr. Kuroda agrees to admit him, and decides to study his symptoms in detail. Using an EEG machine, Kuroda discovers that when Mukoda sleeps, there are brief periods when he enters rapid eye movement sleep, spanning just a few seconds at a time. During this period, his brainwaves become erratic and his eyes thrash about wildly, only to suddenly stop. In that brief moment of REM, he is in the depths of his condition.

With each passing night, the perceived length of Mukoda's dreams seem to be increasing, from months, to years, to decades and then to centuries, and often the experiences he suffers while dreaming are extremely unpleasant. As his dreams continue to lengthen, Mukoda begins to experience amnesia when he wakes up, often having to be reminded by Kuroda as to why he was admitted to hospital. His mannerisms and intonation also begin changing, as if he was speaking as a person from a different century. Mukoda becomes pale and gaunt over time as his illness worsens. Mukoda continues to suffer from his long dreams, and eventually undergoes extreme physical mutations as his dreams become several millennia long within his mind; it is as if Mukoda is really living the length of time he perceives his dreams are, somehow experiencing evolution while still alive. 

The psychological effects of his condition have also only continued to worsen, to the point that he can no longer differentiate his dreams from reality. Believing that Takeshima is his wife from within the dream world, a severely-mutated Mukoda accuses Kuroda of trying to interfere in their 'relationship' upon waking, and accosts Takeshima. Shoving the doctor aside, Mukoda runs to Mami's room with Kuroda in hot pursuit. Terrified, Mami accuses Mukoda of being death, before Kuroda manages to intervene. Mukoda comes to his senses, and asks "What happens to the man who awakens from an eternal dream?" 

Mukoda's mutations continue to worsen, and eventually he barely resembles a human at all. One night, while Kuroda continues to study him, Mukoda enters REM sleep again, and finally experiences an eternal dream. Kuroda, who had himself fallen asleep due to fatigue, awakens to see the result; with his spirit fleeing his body, Mukoda crumbles away into dust, leaving behind strange red crystals.

Shortly afterwards, Takeshima confides to Yamauchi that her fear of death is lessening, but that she too is starting to experience long dreams. Theorising that the illness Mukoda suffered from is contagious, Yamauchi consults Kuroda on the matter, who explains that he had been using the crystals on Takeshima in secret, having realised they were the secret to Mukoda's condition. Yamauchi is horrified by this, stating that it desecrates the souls of the dying, but Kuroda reasons that humanity will have no reason to fear death if they have the option of having eternal dreams instead.

Film ending
In the television drama, the conclusion of the story continues beyond this point, and is significantly different to the ending of the story on which it is based.

Eventually, Takeshima, experiencing a similar mental breakdown to the one Mukoda experienced, murders a nurse at the hospital, then promptly commits suicide.

Yamauchi takes matters into his own hands, and sneaks into Kuroda's office at night to see if he can find any information about the nature of Mukoda and Takeshima's long dreams. He finds a set of video tapes surrounding the case, and then discovers Kuroda's dark secrets. By testing the crystals on Takeshima, Kuroda intends to find a way to enter the dream world, trying to reunite with the spirit of his deceased lover and former patient, Kana Sakurai, who died from an accidental overdose of phenobarbital administered by Kuroda during her treatment at the hospital, a few years prior to the events of the film. Kuroda, having experienced visions involving Kana throughout the film, has also been surreptitiously administering the chemical crystals on himself.

Kuroda suddenly appears in the office, and Yamauchi, horrified by what he has just learned, asks Kuroda just why he would do such a thing. Kuroda reasons that humanity never need fear death again if they had the option to go into an eternal dream. Disgusted, Yamauchi replies that this would desecrate the spirits of the dying. Kuroda breaks down, and reveals that despite taking the crystals, he is now unable to dream at all. Yamauchi comments on the poetic irony of the situation, and prepares to leave, only for Kuroda to bludgeon him to death with a framed photograph of Kana. After a final encounter with Kana's spirit, who bids him farewell, the Doctor turns around to find that horrifyingly, the whole incident had been captured on a set of cameras. By administering the crystals to himself, he has now become infected by whatever caused Mukoda and Takeshima's condition.

Beset by powerful delusions and hallucinations, Kuroda descends into madness (all documented on the cameras), before suddenly waking up in a hospital bed to find Yamauchi - his death having been just another hallucination - and three other doctors taking notes. Much like how Mukoda had been seen scrawling gibberish onto the walls of his room on the ward, Kuroda had repeatedly written Kana's name on the wall multiple times. After Yamauchi asks if Kuroda is feeling okay, the doctor-turned-patient looks down at his mutated hands, and begins weeping as he finally goes insane, bearing mutations similar to those Mukoda had displayed.

Characters
Doctor Kuroda: A celebrated neurosurgeon and the story's protagonist. He initially believes Mukoda's symptoms to be hallucinations, but is soon confounded by the increasingly-bizarre dreams Mukoda presents.
Doctor Yamauchi: Kuroda's assistant and close friend, Yamauchi expresses concern towards Mukoda's condition.
Tetsuro Mukoda: A young man complaining of increasingly long dreams, Mukoda wanders the hallways of his hospital at night, afraid to sleep. Over the ensuing days, he begins to physically mutate, as if he had really lived the amount of time he spent in his dreams, and loses an entire lifetime of memories every time he dreams as well, resulting in bizarre psychological manifestations of his condition. Mukoda eventually experiences an endless dream and shatters into pieces, leaving behind red crystals which Kuroda attempts to treat Mami Takeyama with.
Mami Takeyama: A patient admitted to the hospital with a benign tumour, Takeyama has an intense and irrational fear of death, and is repeatedly terrified by Mukoda during his nightly wanderings around the hospital. She is later treated for her irrational fears by Kuroda using the crystals left after Mukoda died, and begins experiencing lengthening dreams as a result.
Kana Sakurai: Appearing exclusively in the TV Drama, Kana was in a relationship with Kuroda. Much like Mami, Kana was admitted to hospital with a benign tumour, but accidentally died after an overdose of phenobarbital during treatment, leaving Kuroda grief-stricken.

References

Japanese drama television series